Karen Sorensen (born May 20, 1959) is a Canadian politician who has served as a senator from the province of Alberta since July 2021. She previously served as the mayor of Banff, Alberta for three terms, beginning in 2010.

Early life and career
Sorensen was born in Orangeville, Ontario. 

Professionally, she was a hotelier for 17 years before founding Catalyst Enterprises Consulting in 2000, which provides training for the hospitality industry. She is a graduate of the University of Guelph, where she earned a bachelor's degree in geography. Prior to becoming mayor, Sorensen served as a municipal councillor for six years, from 2004 to 2010, and she was as a school trustee for four.

Senate
On July 29, 2021, she was summoned to the Senate of Canada by Governor General Mary Simon, on the advice of prime minister Justin Trudeau. She then joined the Independent Senators Group.

References

1959 births
Living people
Canadian hoteliers
Canadian senators from Alberta
Independent Senators Group
Mayors of places in Alberta
People from Banff, Alberta
People from Orangeville, Ontario
University of Guelph alumni
Women mayors of places in Alberta
Women members of the Senate of Canada
Women hoteliers